Arrestin-C, also known as retinal cone arrestin-3, is a protein that in humans is encoded by the ARR3 gene.

See also 
 Arrestin

References

Further reading

External links